

Events

January
  January 2 – Reopening of Sri Lanka's Northern Line all the way to its terminus at Kankesanthurai.
  January 6 – Groundbreaking of the California High-Speed Rail system, indicating sustained construction activity.

February
  February 3 – The Valhalla train crash, in which a train on Metro-North Railroad's Harlem Line strikes a vehicle at a level crossing in Valhalla, New York, killing six people and injuring 15.
  February 8 – Opening of the South West Rail Link in Sydney.
  February 14 – Rebuilt Benguela railway reopened throughout.
 February 24
  – A Metrolink train on the Ventura County Line strikes a pickup truck at a level crossing in Oxnard, California, injuring 30.
  – The first successful 16,156-mile round trip is completed on the world's longest railway line, the Yixin'ou cargo line, which connects Yiwu, China to Madrid, Spain.

March
  March 1 – Virgin Trains East Coast takes over InterCity East Coast franchise from East Coast
  March 7 – The Cathedrals Express return charter train from Bristol Temple Meads to Southend East, operated by West Coast Railways, overruns a signal passed at danger at Wootton Bassett Junction on the Great Western Main Line where it has a near miss with a First Great Western service from Swansea to London Paddington.
 March 14
  – The Hokuriku Shinkansen high-speed route opens from Nagano to Kanazawa, with the corresponding withdrawal of the 160 km/h express service on the Hokuhoku Line.
  – The Ueno–Tokyo Line route opens between Ueno and Tokyo Station.
  March 21 – 2015 Uttar Pradesh train accident: The Indian Railways Janata Express heading towards Varanasi overshoots a signal and derails near Bachhrawan in Uttar Pradesh, northern India, resulting in at least fifty-eight deaths and 150 injuries.

April
 April 1 – Abellio ScotRail takes over the ScotRail franchise from First ScotRail, while the Caledonian Sleeper service is taken over by Serco
  April 3 – Network Rail suspends West Coast Railways' train operating license following the SPAD incident at Wootton Bassett Junction on March 7.
  April 5 – Reopening of Tri-Rail's Miami Intermodal Center in Miami.

June
  June 2 – Opening of BRT Sunway Line operated by RapidKL in Subang Jaya.
  June 6 – Opening of the Union Pearson Express, an airport rail link in Toronto.
  June 27 – SNCF TGV La Poste commits the last ride, making all high-speed freight services ended after more than 30 years operating.

July
  July 1 – Opening of the Ring Rail Line in Vantaa, Finland.

September
 September 6 – Opening of the Borders Railway along the old Waverley Route.
  September 11 – Opening of KTM Komuter Northern Sector in Penang, Kedah, Perlis and Northern Perak.
  September 12 – Opening of the MAX Orange Line in Portland, Oregon, United States.
  September 13 – New York City Subway 34th Street–Hudson Yards opens to public, after a series of delays.
  September 17 – Opening of the Ashkelon–Beersheba railway.
  September 20 – Opening of one line of the Addis Ababa Light Rail in capital-city of Ethiopia: the first light-rail system to be built in sub-saharan Africa.
  September 26 – Ningbo Rail Transit Line 2 opens connecting Lishe International Airport Station to Qingshuipu Station.

October
 October 16 – Completion of the first phase of Rail Baltica connecting Tallinn, Riga, Kaunas and Warsaw.
 October 31 - The Sri Petaling Line LRT expands from Sri Petaling to Kinrara, the line's first expansion since 1998.

November
  November 17 – The Jaffar Express passenger train traveling from Quetta to Rawalpindi, Pakistan, derails killing 20 and injuring almost a hundred others.

December
  December 11 – The first phase of the Nanning–Kunming High-Speed Railway, connecting Nanning to Baise, China, opens.
  December 13 – Apperley Bridge railway station reopens, fifty years after the original station was closed. 
 December 27 – Downtown MRT line Stage 2 opens.
  December 30 – Construction begins on the Ningbo–Fenghua Intercity Railway in China.

Unknown date 

  – Conclusion of joint project between Turkey, Iran and Pakistan to build 5,000 km freight link. Break-of-gauge arrangements to be confirmed.

References